The 1982–83 season was the 13th season of the Portland Trail Blazers in the National Basketball Association (NBA). The Blazers finished 46–36, a four-game improvement from the previous season.

In the 1983 NBA Playoffs, the Blazers won their first playoff series since their championship season of 1976–77, defeating the Seattle SuperSonics in their first-round best-of-three series in a two-game sweep and gaining a measure of revenge for the Sonics' having eliminated them from the postseason in 1978 and 1980.

However, the Blazers were bested in their Western Conference semi-final series against the Los Angeles Lakers four games to one, on the Lakers' way to the 1983 NBA Finals.

Draft picks

Note:  This is not a complete list; only the first two rounds are covered, as well as any other picks by the franchise who played at least one NBA game.

Roster

Regular season

Season standings

z - clinched division title
y - clinched division title
x - clinched playoff spot

Record vs. opponents

Game log

Playoffs

|- align="center" bgcolor="#ccffcc"
| 1
| April 20
| @ Seattle
| W 108–97
| Thompson, Paxson (25)
| Calvin Natt (11)
| Mychal Thompson (8)
| Kingdome9,211
| 1–0
|- align="center" bgcolor="#ccffcc"
| 2
| April 22
| Seattle
| W 105–96
| Jim Paxson (26)
| Mychal Thompson (12)
| Thompson, Lever (6)
| Memorial Coliseum12,666
| 2–0
|-

|- align="center" bgcolor="#ffcccc"
| 1
| April 24
| @ Los Angeles
| L 97–118
| Mychal Thompson (22)
| Thompson, Natt (9)
| three players tied (7)
| The Forum13,891
| 0–1
|- align="center" bgcolor="#ffcccc"
| 2
| April 26
| @ Los Angeles
| L 106–112
| Calvin Natt (26)
| Wayne Cooper (7)
| Darnell Valentine (15)
| The Forum16,239
| 0–2
|- align="center" bgcolor="#ffcccc"
| 3
| April 29
| Los Angeles
| L 109–115 (OT)
| Paxson, Natt (22)
| Natt, Cooper (10)
| Darnell Valentine (14)
| Memorial Coliseum12,666
| 0–3
|- align="center" bgcolor="#ccffcc"
| 4
| May 1
| Los Angeles
| W 108–95
| Jim Paxson (20)
| Calvin Natt (10)
| Darnell Valentine (11)
| Memorial Coliseum12,666
| 1–3
|- align="center" bgcolor="#ffcccc"
| 5
| May 3
| @ Los Angeles
| L 108–116
| Jim Paxson (32)
| Calvin Natt (11)
| Darnell Valentine (8)
| The Forum16,739
| 1–4
|-

Player statistics

Season

Playoffs

Awards and honors
 Jim Paxson, NBA All-Star

Transactions

References

Portland Trail Blazers seasons
Portland Trail Blazers 1982
Portland Trail Blazers 1982
Po
Portland
Portland